Morlunda, also known as the Col. Samuel McClung Place and Oscar Nelson Farm, is a historic home located near Lewisburg, Greenbrier County, West Virginia. It was built in 1827–1828, and consists of a main house with ell.  The main house is a two-story brick building measuring 56 feet long and 21 feet deep.  The ell measures 48 feet and it connects to a -story formerly detached kitchen.

It was built during 1827–1828 under direction of contractor and architect John W. Dunn.  Interior woodwork was done by wood-carver Conrad Burgess and associates.  Burgess and Dunn worked together on a number of houses, including Mountain Home.

The building was listed on the National Register of Historic Places in 1977.

References

Houses on the National Register of Historic Places in West Virginia
Houses in Greenbrier County, West Virginia
Houses completed in 1828
National Register of Historic Places in Greenbrier County, West Virginia
John W. Dunn buildings